Southern are a brother and sister duo from Belfast, Northern Ireland, playing a mixture of blues, alternative rock and pop.

Music became Thom's sole focus from the age of 16, when he started busking on the streets of Belfast. Lucy joined him a few years later and the two set out to make their mark on their home town. The band was championed by BBC Radio Ulster's Gerry Anderson who described them as "the most promising singer/songwriters in Ireland today."

Thom & Lucy were signed to London-based record label, in 2013 and were immediately picked up as The Guardian's New Band of the Day. Southern have since gone on to support Bastille, Jake Bugg, and Catfish and the Bottlemen.

Discography

EP

Singles

References

External links 
 BBC Radio Ulster feature on the band
 Video - World Don't Shine

Living people
Pop music duos
Rock music duos
Musical groups from Belfast
Musical duos from Northern Ireland
Musical groups established in 2012
Year of birth missing (living people)
2012 establishments in the United Kingdom
Sibling musical duos